Bjerkreim is a municipality in Rogaland county, Norway. It is located in the traditional district of Dalane. The administrative centre of the municipality is the village of Vikeså. Other villages in the municipality include Bjerkreim and Øvrebygd.

Nature has been generous in giving Bjerkreim many idyllic places, making Bjerkreim a good place to live by living in a countryside environment, but still relatively close to a major city, Stavanger. Bjerkreim has one of the most important salmon rivers in Norway, Bjerkreimselva. The most important livelihoods are agriculture and small-scale industries.

The  municipality is the 173rd largest by area out of the 356 municipalities in Norway. Bjerkreim is the 238th most populous municipality in Norway with a population of 2,789.

General information

The parish of Birkrem was established as a municipality on 1 January 1838 (see formannskapsdistrikt law). On 1 January 1965, there were many municipal changes in Norway due to the work of the Schei Committee. On that date, the Nedre Maudal area of Bjerkreim (population: 40) was transferred to the neighboring municipality of Gjesdal.

Name
The municipality (originally the parish) is named after the old Bjerkreim farm, since the first Bjerkreim Church was built there. The first element is the genitive case of bjørk which means "birch" and the last element is heimr which means "homestead" or "farm". Before 1889, the name was written "Birkrem".

Coat of arms
The coat of arms was granted on 11 July 1986. The green and white arms are canting, showing a white (or silver) birch branch on a green background. This was chosen since the name of the municipality is derived from the Norwegian word for birch, .

Churches
The Church of Norway has one parish within the municipality of Bjerkreim. It is part of the Dalane prosti (deanery) in the Diocese of Stavanger.

Government
All municipalities in Norway, including Bjerkreim, are responsible for primary education (through 10th grade), outpatient health services, senior citizen services, unemployment and other social services, zoning, economic development, and municipal roads. The municipality has 2 primary schools and 2 kindergartens. The municipality is governed by a municipal council of elected representatives, which in turn elect a mayor.  The municipality falls under the Sør-Rogaland District Court and the Gulating Court of Appeal. A notable local politician is Olaf Gjedrem, mayor from 1979 to 1993 and later a member of the national parliament.

Municipal council
The municipal council of Bjerkreim is made up of 17 representatives that are elected to four year terms. The executive committee of the council has 5 members, who also make up the authority's planning and economic committee. The mayor of Bjerkreim leads both the council and the executive committee. Currently, the party breakdown is as follows:

Geography
Bjerkreim municipality lies at the northern end of the hilly, rugged Dalane district, just south of the very flat Jæren district. There are several large lakes in Bjerkreim including Austrumdalsvatnet, Byrkjelandsvatnet, Hofreistæ, and Ørsdalsvatnet.

Climate

Transportation
The main means of transportation to Bjerkreim is via the European route E39 highway which passes through the municipality from south to north. The municipality lies in the southwestern part of the country. The distance to the nearest airport, Stavanger airport in Sola, is approximately 40 minutes by car.

Notable people 
 Olaf Gjedrem (born 1948 in Bjerkreim) a Norwegian politician, Mayor of Bjerkreim 1979 to 1993 
 Ragnar Bjerkreim (born 1958 in Bjerkreim) a Norwegian composer of film scores

References

External links

Municipal fact sheet from Statistics Norway 
The River Bjerkreim (Bjerkreimselva)
Visit the South region of Rogaland (Reisemaal Soer Vest)
Fishing equipment

 
Municipalities of Rogaland
1838 establishments in Norway